The Ensuring Quality Information and Transparency for Abroad-Based Listings on our Exchanges Act (EQUITABLE Act) was a proposed bill to amend the Sarbanes-Oxley Act to require the U.S. Securities and Exchange Commission to de-list foreign companies traded on U.S. stock exchanges that do not comply with oversight and audit rules. Under the bipartisan bill, foreign companies traded on U.S. stock exchanges that refused to allow the Public Company Accounting Oversight Board to inspect their financial records would face de-listing. The bill was introduced in 2019 by Marco Rubio and co-sponsored by Bob Menendez, Tom Cotton, and Kirsten Gillibrand. The bill was a response to the lack of financial transparency of Chinese companies listed on U.S. stock exchanges, often resulting from reverse mergers, and defrauding of investors.

See also 

 Holding Foreign Companies Accountable Act
 The China Hustle

References

External links 

 Text of the act

United States federal securities legislation
United States federal financial legislation
Proposed legislation of the 116th United States Congress
China–United States relations